Ephemera annandalei is a species of burrowing mayfly in the family Ephemeridae.

References

Mayflies
Articles created by Qbugbot
Insects described in 1937